Donacia is a large genus of aquatic leaf beetles in the subfamily Donaciinae. Like other members of that subfamily, the beetles have long antennae. They are active and able to fly. Larvae feed on submerged portions of aquatic plants, such as water lilies, and breathe oxygen from plant vessels. Adults live on surface parts of the same plants.

Species
These 72 species belong to the genus Donacia:

 Donacia aequidorsis Kraatz, 1869 g (distributed in northern coast of Russia and in the Caspian Sea area)
 Donacia andalusiaca Kunze, 1818 g (endemic to Spain)
 Donacia antiqua (Linnaeus, 1758) g
 Donacia aquatica Jacobson, 1894 g
 Donacia assimilis Lacordaire, 1845 i c g
 Donacia aureocincta J.Sahlberg, 1821 g
 Donacia bicolora Zschach, 1788 g
 Donacia bicoloricornis Chen g
 Donacia biimpressa Melsheimer, 1847 i c g
 Donacia brevicornis Ahrens, 1810 g (distributed in the North and north-Central Europe)
 Donacia brevitarsis Thomson, 1884 g (distributed from France to Russia including northern Italy and Central Europe)
 Donacia caerulea Olivier, 1795 i c g
 Donacia cazieri Marx, 1957 i c g
 Donacia cincticornis Newman, 1838 i c g
 Donacia cinerea Herbst, 1784 g
 Donacia clavipes Fabricius, 1792 g
 Donacia confluenta Say, 1826 i c g
 Donacia crassipes Fabricius, 1775 g
 Donacia cuprea Kirby, 1837 i c g
 Donacia dentata Hoppe, 1795 g
 Donacia dissimilis Schaeffer, 1925 i c g
 Donacia distincta J. L. LeConte, 1851 i c g
 Donacia edentata Schaeffer, 1919 i c g
 Donacia fastuosa Khnzorian, 1962 g
 Donacia fennica (Paykull, 1800) g (distributed in the Iberian Peninsula and Western Siberia)
 Donacia flemora Goecke, 1944 g
 Donacia frontalis Jacoby, 1893 g
 Donacia fulgens J. L. LeConte, 1851 i c g
 Donacia galaica Baguena, 1959 g
 Donacia hirticollis Kirby, 1837 i c g
 Donacia hypoleuca Lacordaire, 1845 i c g
 Donacia impressa Paykull, 1799 g
 Donacia jacobsoni Semenov & Reichardt, 1927 g
 Donacia koenigi Jacobson, 1927 g
 Donacia lenzi Schonfeldt g
 Donacia liebecki Schaeffer, 1919 i c g
 Donacia limonia Schaeffer, 1925 i c g
 Donacia lungtanensis Hayashi & Lee, 2009 g
 Donacia lusow Hayashi & Lee, 2007 g
 Donacia magnifica J. L. LeConte, 1851 i c g
 Donacia malinovskyi Ahrens, 1810 g (distributed in Central Europe from France to Poland and in Eastern Europe in the Volga valley)
 Donacia marginata Hoppe, 1795 g
 Donacia megacornis Blatchley, 1910 i c g
 Donacia microcephala (Daniel & Daniel, 1904)
 Donacia militaris Lacordaire, 1845 i c g
 Donacia mistshenkoi Jacobson, 1910 g
 Donacia nagaokana (Hayashi, 1998)
 Donacia obscura Gyllenhal, 1813 g
 Donacia ochroleuca Weise, 1912 g
 Donacia ozensis (Nakane, 1954) g
 Donacia palmata Olivier, 1795 i c g
 Donacia parvidens Schaeffer, 1919 i c g
 Donacia piscatrix Lacordaire, 1845 i c g
 Donacia polita Kunze, 1818 g
 Donacia porosicollis Lacordaire, 1845 i c g
 Donacia provostii Fairmaire g
 Donacia proxima Zschach, 1788 g
 Donacia pubescens Kirby, 1837 i c g
 Donacia pubicollis (Suffrian, 1872)
 Donacia reticulata J. L. LeConte, 1868 i c g
 Donacia rufescens Gyllenhal, 1817 g
 Donacia rugosa Lacordaire, 1845 i c g
 Donacia semicuprea J. L. LeConte, 1878 i c g
 Donacia simplex Panzer, 1795 g
 Donacia sparganii Fabricius, 1775 g
 Donacia springeri Ahrens, 1810 g
 Donacia subtilis Müller, 1916 g
 Donacia texana Kunze, 1818 i c g
 Donacia thalassina Crotch, 1873 i c g
 Donacia tomentosa Germar, 1811 g
 Donacia tuberculata Ahrens, 1810 g
 Donacia tuberculifrons Lacordaire, 1845 i c g
 Donacia versicolorea Schaeffer, 1919 i c g
 Donacia vicina (Brahm, 1790) g
 Donacia vulgaris Lacordaire, 1845 i c g

Data sources: i = ITIS, c = Catalogue of Life, g = GBIF, b = Bugguide.net

References

Chrysomelidae genera
Donaciinae
Taxa named by Johan Christian Fabricius